Identical twin brothers Peter Spierig and Michael Spierig, known collectively as the Spierig Brothers, are German-Australian film directors, producers, and screenwriters. They are best known for their 2014 sci-fi thriller, Predestination.

Film career

Peter and Michael made their directing debut in 2003 with Undead, a low-budget zombie horror-comedy film, after they agreed on pooling together their life savings. It won a prize for Best Visual Effects at the Australian Film Institute Awards, and screened at 17 film festivals, including Edinburgh, Montreal, Toronto, Sitges, Berlin, Amsterdam and Puchon.  At the Melbourne International Film Festival, the International Federation of Film Critics awarded Undead the prestigious FIPRESCI Award.  The film was sold to 41 countries, and was released in the US and Canada by Lions Gate Entertainment, who developed a close relationship with Peter and Michael, and backed their second film, Daybreakers.

Daybreakers (2010) starred two-time Academy Award nominee Ethan Hawke, Willem Dafoe, Sam Neill, Claudia Karvan, Vince Colosimo, Michael Dorman, and Isabel Lucas. The film was released in the United States on 2,500 screens in January 2010.

The Spierig brothers' third film was the action sci-fi thriller Predestination based on the 1959 science fiction short story '"—All You Zombies—" by Robert A. Heinlein. The film stars Ethan Hawke and Sarah Snook, and includes an appearance by Noah Taylor. The story recounts that of a detective from a covert government agency (Hawke) who embarks on an intricate series of time-travel journeys in order to catch a master criminal and ensure his own existence. The film was co-written and co-directed by the twins, and was filmed in Australia during Spring of 2013. After its premiere at SXSW on 8 March 2014, the film received many positive reviews including Variety, The Guardian, and IGN Movies.

The two directed the eighth Saw film, Jigsaw, which was released on 27 October 2017. Their next film was Winchester: The House That Ghosts Built, a horror film about the Winchester Mystery House, starring Helen Mirren as heiress Sarah Winchester, and released on 2 February 2018. Both films however received largely negative reviews.

Filmography

Awards and nominations
AACTA Awards

Australian Film Institute Awards

Golden Raspberry Awards

International Federation of Film Critics

Toronto After Dark Film Festival

References

External links
 
 

Living people
German emigrants to Australia
Australian twins
Sibling filmmakers
Queensland College of Art alumni
Australian film directors
Horror film directors
Science fiction film directors
Filmmaking duos
Year of birth missing (living people)
Griffith Film School